Year 505 (DV) was a common year starting on Saturday (link will display the full calendar) of the Julian calendar. At the time, it was known as the Year of the Consulship of Theodorus and Sabinianus (or, less frequently, year 1258 Ab urbe condita). The denomination 505 for this year has been used since the early medieval period, when the Anno Domini calendar era became the prevalent method in Europe for naming years.

Events 
 By place 

 Byzantine Empire 
 Emperor Anastasius I agrees to pay his share of the cost of defending the Caucasian Gates, against nomadic invasions from East Asia.
 Anastasius I decides to rebuild the village of Dara (Northern Mesopotamia). He constructs a new strategic fortress to guard the frontier.
 The white Huns (Hephthalites) from the Caucasus invade the Persian Empire.

 Europe 
 The Colosseum (Amphitheatrum Flavium) in Rome suffers damage from an earthquake, as it did in 422.

Births 
 Belisarius, Byzantine general (d. 565)
 Dorotheus of Gaza, Christian monk and abbot (approximate date)
 Dynod Bwr, king of Hen Ogledd (approximate date)
 Varāhamihira, Indian astronomer and mathematician (d. 587)
 Saint Yared, Axumite composer (d. 571)

Deaths 
 Eugenius, bishop of Carthage
 John I, Coptic Orthodox patriarch of Alexandria

References